Lois Lane is a fictional character first appearing in DC Comics' Action Comics #1 (June 1938), an intrepid reporter and commonly portrayed as the romantic interest of the superhero Superman and his alter-ego Clark Kent. Since her debut in the comic books, she has appeared in various media adaptations including radio, animations, films, television and video games. Actresses who have portrayed Lois Lane include Joan Alexander, Noel Neill, Phyllis Coates, Margot Kidder, Teri Hatcher, Dana Delany, Erica Durance, Kate Bosworth, Amy Adams, Elizabeth Tulloch, among others.

Radio
In the 1940s radio serial The Adventures of Superman (1940-1951), Rolly Bester first voiced Lois Lane, followed by Helen Choate. Joan Alexander voiced the character for most of the series run.
In 1988, BBC Radio 4 produced a documentary drama Superman On Trial celebrating the 50th anniversary of Superman. Following its success, BBC commissioned a six-part radio drama series The Adventures of Superman. Shelley Thompson voiced Lois first and Lorelei King in the latter series.
In 1993, BBC Radio 1 produced a radio series Superman: Doomsday & Beyond, based on the DC Comics story arc "The Death of Superman", featuring Lorelei King as Lois Lane and Stuart Milligan as Clark Kent/Superman.

Broadway musical
In 1966, Patricia Marand played Lois Lane in the Broadway musical It's a Bird, It's a Plane, It's a Superman. For her performance, she was nominated for the Tony Award as Best Supporting or Featured Actress (Musical).
Actress Lesley Ann Warren portrayed Lois in the television production of It's a Bird, It's a Plane, It's Superman in 1975 opposite David Wilson. Warren was among the many actresses who auditioned for the role of Lois Lane in the 1978 film Superman.
In the March 2013 Encores! production of the musical held at the New York City Center, Lois was played by Jenny Powers.

Animated films

Fleischer Superman cartoons

The first animated adaptation of Superman, Fleischer and Famous Studios produced seventeen Superman theatrical cartoons from 1941 to 1943. Fleischer Studios produced the first nine animated short and Famous Studios made the final eight. The first cartoon, Superman, was nominated for an Academy Award in 1941. The animated shorts are considered to be some of the best animations during the Golden age of American animation. Lois Lane was voiced by Joan Alexander who played the character on the Superman radio series.

Superman: Brainiac Attacks
Lois appears in the animated feature film Superman: Brainiac Attacks (2006) voiced by Dana Delany. The film's visual style is the same as the television series Superman: The Animated Series.

Superman: Red Son
Cindy Robinson voiced Lois in the 2009 motion comic Superman: Red Son based on the comic book mini-series of the same name by Mark Millar.

DC Universe animated original movies

Superman: Doomsday
Anne Heche voiced Lois Lane in the animated feature film Superman: Doomsday (2007). Adapted from the DC Comics storyline "The Death of Superman". In the film, Lois is in a relationship with Superman but is only "unofficially" aware of his identity as Clark Kent. It's only after Superman's death that Lois reveals to Martha Kent that she knows her son is Superman. After Superman's resurrection, he finally reveals his secret identity to Lois (telling her that he was a Spelling Bee champion while growing up in Smallville). Lois reacted by leaping into Clark's arms and kissing him.

Justice League: The New Frontier
Kyra Sedgwick voiced Lois Lane, a radio news reporter in the animated film Justice League: The New Frontier (2008). Based on Darwyn Cooke's comic book series of the same name.

Superman/Batman: Public Enemies
Lois has a cameo in the animated film Superman/Batman: Public Enemies (2009).

All-Star Superman
Christina Hendricks voiced Lois Lane in the animated feature film All-Star Superman (2011), based on the acclaimed comic book series of the same name by Grant Morrison.

Justice League: Doom
Grey DeLisle voiced the character in the animated film Justice League: Doom (2012). Lois calls Clark Kent about a man committing suicide by jumping off a building and asks the Justice League for help when Superman is shot with a Kryptonite bullet by Metallo on the street of Metropolis.

Superman vs. The Elite
Based on the comic book story "What's So Funny About Truth, Justice & the American Way?" in Action Comics #775, Pauley Perrette voiced Lois Lane in the animated feature film Superman vs. The Elite (2012).

Superman: Unbound
Stana Katic voiced Lois Lane in the animated feature film Superman: Unbound (2013). Based on the comic book story arc "Superman: Brainiac" by Geoff Johns and Gary Frank published in Action Comics #866-870.

Justice League: The Flashpoint Paradox
Dana Delaney reprised her role as Lois Lane in the animated film Justice League: The Flashpoint Paradox (2013), adapted from the comic book crossover storyline "Flashpoint".

Justice League: Throne of Atlantis
Lois voiced by Juliet Landau appears in the animated film Justice League: Throne of Atlantis (2015).

Justice League: Gods and Monsters
Paget Brewster voiced an alternate universe version of Lois Lane in the animated film Justice League: Gods and Monsters (2015). She is a news reporter for "PLANETNWZ.COM" and a harsh critic of the Justice League's violent and destructive method (due to her skepticism about the League and her father's death caused by one of Superman's confrontations, as revealed in the prequel comic). She changes her mind about them after they stop Dr. Magnus from taking over the world. Lois also appears in the tie-in comic book series and the web series Justice League: Gods and Monsters Chronicles.

The Death of Superman and Reign of the Supermen
Voiced by Rebecca Romijn, Lois Lane plays a prominent role in the two-part animated films The Death of Superman (2018) and Reign of the Supermen (2019). Romijn's husband Jerry O'Connell voiced Superman/Clark Kent in the films. Based on the acclaimed DC comic story arc and the second animated adaptations of The Death and Return of Superman. DC Comics also released a tie-in digital-first comic book mini-series.

Batman: Hush
In the animated film Batman: Hush (2019) Romijn and O'Connell reprise their roles as Lois and Superman/Clark. After Batman and Catwoman track Poison Ivy to Metropolis Lois and Clark meets Bruce Wayne at the Daily Planet. When Poison Ivy takes control of Superman, she orders him to kill Batman and Catwoman. Batman stalls Superman while Catwoman pushes Lois off the Daily Planet building, Superman breaks free of Poison Ivy 's control and saves Lois.

Superman: Red Son
Amy Acker voiced Lois Lane in the animated film Superman: Red Son (2020) based on the comic book mini-series written by Mark Millar. Raised in the Soviet Union, Superman becomes the champion of the people, and is dub by the American media the "Soviet Superman". Lois is married to Lex Luthor. She meets Superman when he prevents a satellite from crashing into Metropolis and interviews him on the roof of the Daily Planet, where she shows him documents of secret Soviet gulag. This leads Superman to confront Stalin, and becoming the new leader of the Soviet Union and begins to spread the influence of the Soviet state. Years later, Luthor becomes President of the United States with Lois as the press secretary and Vice President James Olsen ushers in a new age of prosperity in the United States that threatens Superman and the Soviet dominance.

Justice League Dark: Apokolips War
Romijn and O'Connell reprise their roles as Lois and Superman/Clark in the animated film Justice League Dark: Apokolips War (2020). Two years after a failed preemptive strike by the Justice League against Darkseid, Darkseid's forces have taken over Earth and Earth is in ruin. Superman has lost his powers after Darkseid infused liquid Kryptonite into his body. Lois helped recruited members of the Suicide Squad led by Harley Quinn. Superman and his wife Lois and the remaining heroes on Earth form a plan to stop the "Reapers", devices used by Darkseid to drain Earth's magma which will destabilize and destroy the planet. Lois also assists the team in stopping the Paradooms' assault at the LexCorp building before she sets the building to be self-destructed, sacrificing herself. Her death causes much grief to Superman to the point he frees himself from Trigon's possession.

Superman: Man of Tomorrow
In the animated film Superman: Man of Tomorrow (2020) Alexandra Daddario voiced Lois Lane. An original story written by Tim Sheridan, featuring a young Clark Kent still early in his career as Superman and working as an intern for the Daily Planet and learning on the job how to save the city of Metropolis. At the start of the film, during a Lexcorp event at S.T.A.R. Labs, Luthor is arrested by the authority when Lois (a recipient of Luthor journalism scholarship) plays a tape recording of Luthor's illegal dealings. Lois, a grad student, is hired by Perry White at the Daily Planet and meets Clark Kent. She later interviews Lobo at S.T.A.R. Labs and live streams the final battle between Superman and Parasite at a nuclear power plant.

Injustice
Laura Bailey voiced Lois Lane in the animated film Injustice (2021). Based on the video game Injustice: Gods Among Us and the comic book series of the same name. The film follows a grief-stricken Superman who goes rogue and starts to enforce peace and order on earth after the Joker tricked Superman into killing his wife Lois and their unborn child and detonating a nuclear bomb that destroys Metropolis. At the end of the film, Mister Terrific brings a version of Lois from Earth-9, who is also pregnant and lost her husband Superman, and reminds him that every life is sacred. Realizing how far he has fallen, Superman willingly surrenders and agrees to be imprisoned.

Batman and Superman: Battle of the Super Sons
Laura Bailey voiced Lois Lane in the animated film Batman and Superman: Battle of the Super Sons (2022).

Lego DC Comics films
Lois Lane appears in the Lego DC Comics films voiced by Grey Griffin:
In Lego DC Comics: Batman Be-Leaguered (2014), the disappearance of Superman was reported by Lois.
She appeared in the animated film Lego DC Comics Super Heroes: Justice League – Attack of the Legion of Doom (2015).
She is a news reporter in the animated film Lego DC Super Hero Girls: Brain Drain (2017).
In Lego DC Comics Super Heroes: The Flash (2018), Lois reports an attack on Metropolis by the Joker, who released laughing gas in the city.
She appeared in the animated film Lego DC Super Hero Girls: Super-Villain High (2018).
In Lego DC Comics Super Heroes: Aquaman: Rage of Atlantis (2018), Lois and Jimmy report the attacks by Lobo on Area 52 and the Atlanteans on the surface world.
Lois appears in Lego DC: Shazam!: Magic and Monsters (2020).

Space Jam: A New Legacy
Lois has a cameo in the animated film Space Jam: A New Legacy (2021). She appears on the runaway train in Metropolis in the DC world.

DC League of Super-Pets
In the animated film DC League of Super-Pets (2022), Olivia Wilde voiced Lois Lane, with John Krasinski as Clark Kent/Superman. Lois is a news broadcaster for the Daily Planet. She reports attacks and battles in Metropolis on the Daily Planet news channel. Lois is also dating Superman, who eventually proposes to her, which she happily accepts.

Animated series

The New Adventures of Superman
Joan Alexander returned to voice Lois in the 1960s Filmation animated TV series The New Adventures of Superman.

Super Friends
Lois appears in the Super Friends animated series, voiced by Shannon Farnon. In the episode "Super Friends, Rest in Peace" from the Challenge of the Super Friends season, Lex Luthor and Solomon Grundy hold her and Perry White hostage to lure Superman into a trap. Superman rescues them but is seemingly killed in the process and she mourns, until it is eventually revealed he and the other heroes faked their deaths to fool the villains. In the episode "The Rise and Fall of the Super Friends", Mister Mxyzptlk summons a living mannequin with Lois' face that wears a wedding dress and a kryptonite wedding ring to attack Superman. When Superman collapses from the kryptonite, Mxyzptlk makes the mannequin disappear and mocks him.

In The World's Greatest Super Friends season, she appears in the episode "Lex Luthor Strikes Back", where she and Jimmy Olsen attempt to interview Lex Luthor in prison, only for her to discover Jimmy has been replaced by Luthor's assistant Orville Grump. Orville and Luthor use a device to swap Lois and Luthor's appearances, then lock her in his cell while Luthor and Orville leave pretending to be Lois and Jimmy. Fortunately, Superman confirms her identity with his x-ray vision, restores her appearance, and releases her.

In the 1980s Super Friends series in the episode "The Ice Demon", Lois investigates a mysterious Ice Monster story with Clark Kent. She cameos in the episodes "The Bride of Darkseid", "Reflections in Crime", and "Mr. Mxyzptlk and the Magic Lamp" in the Super Friends: The Legendary Super Powers Show season, voiced by Mary McDonald Lewis.

Superman
Ginny McSwain voiced Lois in the 1988 animated Saturday morning television series Superman produced by Ruby-Spears Productions.

Superman: The Animated Series

Actress Dana Delany voiced Lois Lane in Superman: The Animated Series (1996-2000). Delany was cast in the role after the producers were impressed by her performance as Andrea Beaumont in Batman: Mask of the Phantasm (1993). Delany based her performance on Rosalind Russell's character in the film His Girl Friday. In this version, series creator Bruce Timm and character designer James Tucker portrayed the character more like her original Golden Age comic counterpart, in that at first her relationship with Clark Kent was very much a rivalry about which was the better reporter. She would at times actively attempt to trick him out of stories. But Lois eventually learns to respect Clark, and in episodes like "The Late Mr. Kent" takes a faked death of Clark significantly hard, admitting to Superman that she regretted never telling her rival she respected him as a reporter and really liked him. In this version, Lois constantly teases Clark by calling him "Smallville" (a line since adapted for mainstream comics).

At first skeptical about Superman, Lois grows closer to him throughout the series. Lois had mentioned that she previously dated Lex Luthor before she dumped him. In the three-part story "World's Finest", Wayne Enterprises CEO Bruce Wayne arrives in Metropolis and starts a relationship with Lois. Lois actually considers moving to Gotham City and transferring to the Daily Planet branch there much to Clark's dismay. She ends the relationship after discovering that Bruce is the infamous masked vigilante Batman, stating she can't be a part of his secret life, although in "The Demon Reborn" she tells Bruce that she had second thoughts about the relationship and almost called him several times. Superman and Lois did not share their first kiss until the final moments of this animated series' last episode "Legacy" (although Lois had kissed an alternate version of Superman in the episode "Brave New Metropolis").

Lois also appeared in the comic book series Superman Adventures and is based on Superman: The Animated Series. The comic book series ran from November 1996 to April 2002.

Batman Beyond
Lois makes a cameo appearance in the Batman Beyond episode "Out of the Past". Her picture is shown on a file in the Batcomputer kept by Bruce Wayne, alongside pictures of his other romances in his younger days.

Justice League and Justice League Unlimited
Reprised by Dana Delany, Lois appeared in DC animated universe series Justice League and its follow-up series Justice League Unlimited. In Justice League Unlimited, Superman and Lois have started dating.

The Batman
Dana Delany reprised her role as Lois in the two-part episode "The Batman/Superman Story" in The Batman animated series. Lois and Jimmy Olsen are in Gotham City reporting on Superman's visit to deliver a check from Metropolis. When Metallo attacks Superman, Lois and Jimmy follow the fight to the junkyard. After Batman and Superman defeat Metallo, she asks for an interview. Back in Metropolis, she is kidnapped by Clayface and Black Mask for Lex Luthor to lure and infuriate Superman. After being rescued, Lois tells Superman that Black Mask was working with Luthor, Superman leaves to confront Luthor.

Batman: The Brave and the Bold
In Batman: The Brave and the Bold episode "The Super-Batman of Planet X!" the respective fictional universes of Batman and Superman are merged to create a unique setting based on France Herron's 1958 story in Batman #113. Vilsi Vaylar voiced by Dana Delany is a reporter for the Solar Cycle Globe from the planet Zur-En-Arrh and is a composite of Lane and Vicki Vale.

Lois appears in the episode "Battle of the Superheroes!" voiced by Sirena Irwin. She is first seen being captured by Lex Luthor, only to be saved by Batman. When Lois unknowingly receives a Red Kryptonite necklace, it causes Superman to turn evil. She and Jimmy Olsen were rescued by Krypto when Superman attacked their protest march. Batman and Krypto had to fight Superman until the effects of the Red Kryptonite wore off. Lois and Jimmy were present when Batman and Superman found the real Luthor since the one that was arrested before was one of Luthor's robotic duplicates.

Tales of Metropolis
Maria Bamford voiced Lois in Tales of Metropolis, a series of shorts that aired on Cartoon Network as part of the DC Nation animations. In the episode "Lois" she chases Batman across Metropolis and Gotham City seeking an interview with him.

DC Super Hero Girls
In the first DC Super Hero Girls series, Lois is a news reporter voiced by Alexis G. Zall. Her character also appeared in the comic books and the animated films related to the series.
In Cartoon Network's DC Super Hero Girls animated series, Grey Griffin voiced Lois Lane. Lois is a student at Metropolis High and editor-in-chief of the school newspaper "Daily Planetoid". Lois hopes to get an internship at the Daily Planet and writes and reports local news and events in Metropolis, including the heroic deeds of Super Hero Girls. In the episode "#BreakingNews", she uncovers the civilian identities of the superhero teams but decides against publishing the story.

Justice League Action
Lois appears in the animated series and its web series Justice League Action, voiced by Tara Strong. In the episode "Race Against Crime", she hosts a charity race between Superman and the Flash sponsored by Bruce Wayne.

Young Justice
In the animated series, Young Justice Grey Griffin voiced Lois. In the season 3 episode "Home Fires", Lois and her son Jon arrive at Iris West's home for a playdate with the children of other superheroes. In the season 4 episode "I Know Why the Caged Cat Sings", Lois, Clark, and Jon are in Smallville at the Kent farm for a family gathering and mourning the death of Conner Kent. In the season 4 finale, Clark and Lois reveal to Jon that Conner is alive. The Kent family later attends Conner and Miss Martian's wedding in Smallville.

Harley Quinn
Natalie Morales voiced Lois Lane in the animated series Harley Quinn. In the episode "Finding Mr. Right", Harley Quinn and her crew tie up Lois at the Daily Planet and try to get her to retract an article written about Harley. But Lois is unconcerned and laughs off Harley's threats. When Superman shows up, Harley tries to convince him to be Harley's nemesis. When Robin arrives, Superman decides to step aside and let Robin fight Harley. Harley is so insulted that she and her crew leave. Lois and Superman later go on a date at a sushi restaurant, while watching Harley (along with Poison Ivy), Batman and Joker fighting each other on TV.

My Adventures with Superman
Alice Lee will voice Lois Lane in the upcoming HBO Max and Cartoon Network animated series My Adventures with Superman, with Jack Quaid as Superman/Clark Kent. The series will follow the adventures of Clark, Lois and their friend Jimmy Olsen as an investigative reporting team at the Daily Planet.

Live-action films

1940s Superman serials

Noel Neill played Lois Lane in the first live-action appearance of Superman on film in the Columbia Pictures 15-part movie serial Superman (1948) with Kirk Alyn as Clark Kent/Superman. The movie was a popular success and launched Neill's career as an actress. A sequel, Atom Man vs. Superman, also starring Neill and Alyn was released in 1950.

Neill previously had a recurring role in producer Sam Katzman's "The Teen Agers" musical comedy series, playing a reporter for a high school newspaper. When Katzman was making the Superman serial, he remembered Neill's newshawk portrayals and cast her to play Lois.

Superman and the Mole Men
Released by Lippert Pictures, Superman and the Mole Men (1951) is the first theatrical feature film based on any DC Comics character. The film served as a trial balloon release for the syndicated TV series Adventures of Superman, and later became the two-part episode  "The Unknown People". Phyllis Coates played Lois Lane.

Stamp Day for Superman
Stamp Day for Superman is a 1954 short film made for the United States Department of the Treasury to promote the purchase of U.S. Savings Bonds, distributed to schools as a means of educating children about the program. Warner Bros. released the film as part of the Adventures of Superman season 2 DVD set. Noel Neill appeared as Lois with George Reeves as Superman.

Christopher Reeve Superman films

Canadian-born actress Margot Kidder played Lois Lane opposite Christopher Reeve in Superman (1978), Superman II (1980), Superman III (1983), and Superman IV: The Quest for Peace (1987).

The filmmakers had a very specific concept for Lois: liberated, hard-nosed, witty and attractive. Kidder was cast because director Richard Donner and the producers agreed that her performance had a certain spark and vitality, and because of her strong interaction with Christopher Reeve. Donner feels Kidder seemed to convey the general American concept of Lois Lane—pretty, pert and perky, intelligent and ambitious without being pushy. Actresses who auditioned for the role include Anne Archer, Deborah Raffin, Susan Blakely, Stockard Channing, and Lesley Ann Warren.

Kidder appeared in two episodes of The CW television series Smallville as Dr. Bridgette Crosby, an emissary of Dr. Virgil Swann (played by Christopher Reeve). She declined to make a third appearance on the show after Reeve's death because she felt it would be doing his memory a disservice.

Superman Returns

Directed and produced by Bryan Singer, Kate Bosworth played Lois Lane in the 2006 film Superman Returns opposite Brandon Routh as Clark Kent/Superman.

Superman returns to Earth after five years travelling in space to investigate what he believed to be his home planet Krypton. Upon returning to Metropolis as his alter-ego reporter Clark Kent, he is shocked to discover the consequences of his disappearance. In his absence, his love Lois Lane, a fellow journalist at the Daily Planet is engaged to Richard White (the nephew of editor-in-chief Perry White) and shares a young son, Jason, with Richard. The criminal mastermind Lex Luthor was released from prison because Superman did not testify against Luthor during his appeal trial. After seducing an old heiress, Luthor inherits her fortune and begins his plot against Superman.

Superman reemerges to the world when he saves a space shuttle test launch during a mysterious nationwide power outage, triggered by Luthor using Kryptonian technology. Lois investigating the power outage, tracks the source to a mansion own by Luthor, along with her son, she is held captive on a superyacht heading into the Atlantic Ocean. Luthor plans to use the Kryptonian crystal, stolen from the Fortress of Solitude to create a new land mass, which in turn will destroy the United States.

Aboard the yacht, Lois manages to send a message for help thought the fax machine to the Daily Planet and was received by Richard and Clark. However, one of Luthor's henchmen catch her and attempt to attack Lois, causing Jason's superpower to emerge and crushing the henchman with a piano, revealing Jason is, in fact, Superman's son. Luthor and his men escape by helicopter. While Superman works to contain the damage in the city, Richard reaches the yacht with a small plane. When the boat starts to sink, the three of them become trapped and Lois is knocked unconscious. Superman rescues them in time and takes them to Richard's plane for safety. Superman pursues Luthor, who has made his way to the new landmass infused with kryptonite. Luthor easily defeats Superman, stabbing him with a kryptonite shard and leaving him to drown in the sea. Regaining consciousness, Lois knowing of the kryptonite danger convinces Richard to turn the plane around. They spot Superman in the water and takes him into the plane, where Lois removes the kryptonite shard. Recovered, Superman flies the landmass into out space.

Complications from kryptonite exposure cause Superman to fall into a coma. Lois visits him in the hospital and whispers in his ear concerning Jason's paternity. Soon after, Superman visits Jason and repeats the words of his own father as Jason sleeps. And Lois starts to write an article titled "Why the World Needs Superman".

DC Extended Universe

Man of Steel

Actress Amy Adams portrays Lois Lane in the 2013 Superman reboot film Man of Steel with Henry Cavill as Clark Kent/Superman, directed by Zack Snyder and produced by Christopher Nolan.

Snyder on casting Adams as Lois Lane: "Amy has the talent to capture all of the qualities we love about Lois: smart, tough, funny, warm, ambitious and, of course, beautiful." Snyder said they cast Adams because she is "supermodern." Producer Deborah Snyder says, "Lois is independent and definitely not a damsel in distress. And she's never afraid to get her hands dirty." Adams said: "Lois is just very natural, nothing about her is contrived or manufactured." Adams on her character as following the idea of the independent, feisty woman, but set in a more identifiable world, "Snyder's film has a modern take on journalism: a world of blogs, instant news, online paranoia. She has become more of a free-ranging journalist, someone who likes to be hands-on. The nature of the newspaper business has changed so much. There is so much more pressure." This was the third time Adams auditioned for the role of Lois Lane. She previously auditioned for the role in Superman Returns and the aborted Superman: Flyby.

In the screenplay, Lois' background as a Pulitzer Prize-winning journalist is filled out with a mention of her stint as an embedded reporter with the First Infantry Division of the U.S. Army. In the film, Lois suggested Clark call himself "Superman" after she noticed the symbol on his chest resembled an English "S." Clark explains that the symbol is the El family crest and on his home planet, it means hope. Screenwriter David S. Goyer has revealed a deleted scene from the film, where after Lois is captured by the FBI, they interrogate her and she refuses to reveal Superman's identity.

In the film, Lois arrives in the Arctic to research a story about an alien occurrence in the Arctic. She follows a mysterious man into an ice tunnel (a disguised Clark Kent tracking a buried Kryptonian scout ship). When she is attacked by a security droid protecting the ship, Lois is made aware of Clark's abilities when he saves her life. As a result of those events, Lois begins writing an expose piece for the Daily Planet on her mysterious savior. She tracks down Clark's identity to Smallville and interviews his mother. After learning the circumstances surrounding his adopted father's death and Clark's desire to remain hidden from society, Lois ceases writing the piece.

When General Zod arrived on Earth, he demanded the citizens of Earth relinquish Kal-El to Zod's custody. Shortly thereafter, Lois is apprehended by the government once her association with Kal-El is known. Superman confronted the government officials to secure Lois' release at a military installation while turning himself over to them. Superman, in cooperation with the military, agrees to surrender to Zod's emissary, who also takes Lois aboard their spaceship. On the ship, Lois escapes with the help of Jor-El, she restores Earth's atmosphere on the ship, restoring Superman's powers and enables him to escape Zod's trap and eventually defeating the Kryptonian forces when they attack Earth. When Zod forces Superman to kill him, Lois consoles Superman, who is distraught after ending Zod's life. At the conclusion, Clark is introduced by Perry White to Lois as the new stringer for the Daily Planet, which will become Clark's new secret identity. Lois, surprised but willing to keep his secret, plays along and welcomes him.

Batman v Superman: Dawn of Justice
Adams reprises her role as Lois Lane in Batman v Superman: Dawn of Justice (2016). On Lois' role in the film, Adams said: "Lois is still sort of like the key to the information" explaining that the character is still very much in the mix because she's the one acquiring information and putting the pieces together.

At the beginning of the film, Lois is in Africa interviewing a terrorist group. A massacre breaks out, she is held hostage by the group's leader and is saved by Superman. It is shown Clark and Lois have moved in together and their relationship is still going strong. Lois flies to Washington D.C. to investigate who is behind the attack in Africa when Superman is blamed for the incident. She discovers that Lex Luthor orchestrated the attack and witnesses the bombing at the congressional Superman hearing. Lois tries to convince Clark that Superman still means hope to people, but Clark filled with guilt for not detecting the bomb at the hearing goes on a self-imposed exile.

Lex lures Superman from exile by abducting Lois and pushing her off a building. Superman learns that Lex has also kidnapped his mother Martha and knows he is Clark Kent and forced him to fight Batman for Martha's life. Lois eventually arrives at the area where Superman and Batman are fighting. She helps Clark convinces Batman not to kill him for Martha's sake and later tries to retrieve the kryptonite spear in nearby water when Doomsday shows up. Superman tells Lois he loves her and she is his world, before sacrificing himself, killing Doomsday. Lois is devastated by Clark's death. At the funeral, Martha revealed to Lois that Clark was going to propose to her and gave Lois the engagement ring. In Batman's nightmare/dream, Bruce sees the Flash trying to tell him that "It's Lois, it's Lois Lane. She's the key."

Justice League
Adams reprises her role as Lois Lane in the film Justice League (2017). Lois becomes Batman's contingency plan when Batman and his allies decide to resurrect Superman to help fight off the threat of Steppenwolf and his army of Parademons. After regaining part of his memory upon seeing Lois, Superman leaves with Lois to his family home in Smallville, where Clark and Lois reaffirm their love for each other. After Steppenwolf is defeated, Superman resumes his life as reporter Clark Kent, and Lois publishes an article in the Daily Planet about her belief in heroism and hope.

In Zack Snyder's Justice League, the 2021 director's cut of the film, a pregnancy test is shown in Lois' bedside drawer and confirmed by Snyder that Lois is pregnant in the movie. And Superman sensing her pregnancy, help him calmed down during the fight with the other heroes in Heroes Park. The movie includes a scene where Martian Manhunter, disguised as Martha Kent, visits Lois in her apartment and persuades her to go back to work at the Daily Planet.

Live-action television

Adventures of Superman

Following the film Superman and the Mole Men, which served as a pilot for television series Adventures of Superman (1952-1958), the series went into production in late 1951. Phyllis Coates played Lois Lane in the first season opposite George Reeves as Clark Kent/Superman. The production stop after season one.

When the cereal company Kellogg's agreed to sponsor the show the series resumed filming, however, Coates had made committed to other projects and did not return as Lois. Noel Neill who had previously played the character in Columbia Pictures' Superman film serial stepped into the role from season two to season six until the series cancellation in 1958.

Coates portrayed Lois as a sharp, strong-willed, efficient and tough, a resourceful reporter who tries to outscoop Clark Kent. Coates played Ellen Lane, the mother of Lois, in the first season of the 1990s television series Lois & Clark: The New Adventures of Superman.

Neill's Lois was more accessible to the younger audience, sweeter and more sympathetic. She cameoed in the 1978 film Superman as Lois' mother, and guest starred in the 1980s Superboy series. Neill appeared in the 2006 film Superman Returns as Lex Luthor's dying wealthy wife.

Lois & Clark: The New Adventures of Superman

Teri Hatcher portrayed Lois Lane in the television series Lois & Clark: The New Adventures of Superman (1993-1997) with Dean Cain as Superman/Clark Kent. In the series, Lois was described as "complicated, domineering, uncompromising, stubborn and brilliant." 

The series mirrored Superman's modern origin, established by writer John Byrne, where Clark Kent is the true personality, and Superman is the disguise. This is the first television series or films which shows Lois and Clark's romance fully realized, with the two leading characters getting married during the series run.

Hatcher made a guest appearance on the television series Smallville playing Lois' mother Ella in a videotape that she recorded for her daughter before her death. She played Queen Rhea of Daxam and the mother of Mon-El in the series Supergirl.

Smallville

Erica Durance portrayed Lois Lane in the television series Smallville. The character was described as "sophisticated, worldly experience, street smart, and a very capable woman." Durance describes Lois as "a tomboy and fiercely independent." Producer Kelly Souders said Lois was one of the most difficult characters to play "because she's super-opinionated, extremely bright and a little abrupt, and at the same time she has to be likable." Series developer Alfred Gough said it was always their intention to bring the character into the series.

Lois first appeared in season four as the cousin of Chloe Sullivan, a recurring character, but became a series regular after several episodes. The series explored her progression from rebellious teenager to resolute investigative reporter. She began as an annoyance to Clark Kent during season four, but slowly their relationship evolved with Lois demonstrating an insight into Clark even in his more private moments. Eventually, she became his love interest in season eight and his fiancée in the final tenth season. Clark and Lois had a wedding in the series finale, but the ceremony was interrupted by the coming of Darkseid and Apokolips. The series ends with Clark finally becoming Superman, and a flash forward seven years into the future, where Clark and Lois are still working at the Daily Planet and still trying to find the right time to get married.

The television series was adapted and continued in the comic book series Smallville: Season 11. The comic series continues approximately six months after Clark Kent puts on the costume and debuts as Superman to the world.  The series continues to follow the lives and adventures of Clark and Lois as a couple and many other Smallville characters, as they face new challenges and villains.

Smallville's season four DVD box set includes a featurette titled "Being Lois Lane" a retrospective examining the manner in which the character has been depicted over the years in films and television. Three actresses who have portrayed Lois Lane are featured; Noel Neill, Margot Kidder, and Dana Delany.

Durance appeared in a recurring role in the television series Supergirl as Kara's Kryptonian mother, Alura Zor-El. She reprised her role as Lois Lane in the Arrowverse crossover event "Crisis on Infinite Earths". Set ten years after the Smallville series, Lois and Clark are now married with young daughters, and Clark gave up his powers to be with his family.

Arrowverse

Lois Lane portrayed by Elizabeth Tulloch appears in the Arrowverse television series. The executive producers described the character as "dogged, determined and brave reporter, a strong partner to Superman and an amazing addition to the Arrowverse of DC characters."

In the 2018 "Elseworlds" crossover, when John Deegan rewrites reality, Oliver Queen and Barry Allen, with swapped abilities escape Earth-1 and travel to Earth-38 to get help from Kara/Supergirl and meets Clark and Lois at the Kent farm in Smallville. Clark and Lois later go to Earth-1 and assists Supergirl, Green Arrow, and the Flash in fighting John Deegan in the form of a black suit-wearing Superman. After reality is restored and returning to Earth-38, Clark and Lois reveal to Kara that they are expecting a baby and will be returning to Argo City for an extended period. Later, at the Fortress of Solitude, Clark proposes to Lois with a diamond ring made from coal. She happily accepts and kisses him.

In the 2019 crossover "Crisis on Infinite Earths", Lois and Clark are married and are living on Argo City with their infant son Jonathan. They and their son are forced to evacuate Argo City before it is consumed by the Anti-Monitor's anti-matter wave. When Jonathan's escape pod unintentionally ends up on Earth-16, Brainy helps Lois retrieve him. Lois and Clark helped the earth's heroes defeat the Anti-Monitor. Following the crisis, the multiverse is restored but changed, with the couple now having two sons.

Superman & Lois

In 2021, Elizabeth Tulloch and Tyler Hoechlin reprise their roles as Lois Lane and Superman in the television series Superman & Lois. In the series, they have two teenage sons, Jonathan and Jordan Kent.

In season 1, after Clark's mother Martha dies, Clark and Lois move the family from Metropolis to Smallville. Lois quits her job after Morgan Edge buys the Daily Planet and start working at a local newspaper Smallville Gazette. Lois begins to investigate Edge, who is mining X-Kryptonite in Smallville and is experimenting on people giving them superpowers.

The series also depicts an alternate universe where Lois married John Henry Irons and had a daughter called Natalie. However, she died when Earth was attacked by an evil version of Superman, driving Irons to attack this Superman on the grounds that he believes "this" Superman is just as corrupt as his own.

Video games
 Lois appears in the Atari 2600 Superman video game. If Superman is hit by one of Lex Luthor's roving Kryptonite satellites, he loses his powers. Touching Lois will restore them. Depending on the difficulty setting, she will either appear immediately when Superman is hit or the player will have to search for her.
 Lois appears in the Famicom/NES Superman video game by Kemco. She provides information to Clark Kent throughout the game.
 Lois appears in the Superman: Shadow of Apokolips video game voiced by Dana Delany.
 Lois appears in the Superman: The Man of Steel video game voiced by Monica Murray.
 Lois appears in the Superman Returns video game voiced by Kate Bosworth, which is based on the movie of the same name.
 Lois appears in the DC Universe Online video game voiced by Adriene Mishler.
 Lois, along with Jimmy Olsen and Professor Hamilton appeared in Superman 64 as Lex Luthor's hostages.
 Lois appears as an unlockable playable character in Lego Batman 2: DC Super Heroes voiced by Bridget Hoffman.
 Lois is referenced in Injustice: Gods Among Us. She appears in Superman's set of STAR Labs missions where Lex Luthor kidnaps her and appears as a support card for Superman on the iOS version of the game. The game's events are set off by the death of an alternate universe version of Lois, as well as the destruction of Metropolis, orchestrated by the Joker in order to drive Superman over the edge.
 Lois appears as a non-playable character in Lego Dimensions voiced by Courtenay Taylor. She reports on the merger between Metropolis and Gotham in the game and the players must safely escort her as she does her job.
 Lois appears as a playable character and the introduction to each level, through her news reports, in Lego DC Super-Villains voiced by Cissy Jones. She also plays a role in the game's story, on which she voices her suspicions for the "Justice Syndicate"'s apparent heroic acts (and also of Kent Clarkson's true motives). She later appears helping the Justice League and the Legion of Doom expose the Syndicate for who they are by recording a conversation between Flash and Johnny Quick about the Syndicate having been sent by Darkseid to retrieve the last piece of the Anti-Life Equation from the Mother Box which Harley Quinn kept for herself.
 Lois is an interactive character in the Nintendo Switch video game DC Super Hero Girls: Teen Power voiced by Grey Griffin.
 Lois appears in the video game Teen Titans Go Figure!.

References

Lois Lane